Original Monarch Pass (elevation ) is a mountain pass on the border of Gunnison and Chaffee counties of west-central Colorado. Original Monarch Pass divides the watersheds of No Name Creek, a tributary of Tomichi Creek and the Gunnison River, to the west and the South Arkansas River to the east. The name Monarch comes from nearby Monarch Ridge and the community of Monarch. 

Original Monarch Pass has also been referred to as Old Old Monarch Pass.

History

In 1880, a toll road was constructed over this first Monarch Pass. The new road became an important route for wagons and stagecoaches traveling from the town of South Arkansas (later named Salida) on the east side to the booming mining camps on the west side of the divide. The road also allowed travel on to the growing city of Gunnison and points farther west. The pass later accommodated motor vehicles, and remained an important crossing of the divide until 1922, when the state highway department realigned the road to cross the divide at a slightly lower point  to the southeast. This second Monarch Pass is now known as Old Monarch Pass. This third pass is now known as Monarch Pass.

Today Original Monarch Pass can be reached by hiking north along the Continental Divide Trail from Old Monarch Pass. It can also be reached by hiking up the abandoned toll road from the west. The old toll road on the east side of the pass is now used as a service road within the Monarch Ski Area and is not accessible to the public.

References

External links
 
Monarch Pass - Original, passbagger.org

Mountain passes of Colorado
Landforms of Gunnison County, Colorado
Landforms of Chaffee County, Colorado
Great Divide of North America
Transportation in Chaffee County, Colorado
Transportation in Gunnison County, Colorado